Clement Reid FRS (6 January 1853 – 10 December 1916) was a British geologist and palaeobotanist.

Life
Reid was born in London in 1853. His great uncle was Michael Faraday. His family circumstances meant he was largely self-taught but he was nonetheless able to join the Geological Survey of Great Britain in 1874 and be employed in drawing up geological maps in various parts of the country. In 1894 he was appointed Geologist and in 1901 District Geologist. He retired in 1913.

He was particularly concerned with tertiary geological deposits and their paleontology, and is most renowned for the work he did on quaternary and Pliocene deposits alongside his wife Eleanor in Norfolk.

He was awarded The Murchison Fund in 1886, won the Bigsby Medal in 1897, was elected Fellow of the Geological Society in 1875, and was vice-president of the Geological Society of London 1913–1914. He was elected a Fellow of the Linnean Society in 1888.

In 1899 he was elected a Fellow of the Royal Society, his application citation reading:  

From 1899 to 1909, Reid undertook the analysis of archaeobotanical remains from the Roman town of Silchester.

In 1913 he published his book "Submerged Forests" in which he postulated a drowned land bridge between eastern England and the European mainland. His conceptual map of what is now called "Doggerland" turned out to be remarkably close to the currently known reality.

He died in Milford-on-Sea, Hampshire in 1916. He had married in St Asaph in 1897 Eleanor Mary Wynne Edwards. She became a fellow herself and won the Lyell Medal for her work after Reid died.

References

 Preece, R.C. & Killeen, I.J., 1995. Edward Forbes (1815-1854) and Clement Reid (1853-1916): two generations of pioneering polymaths. Archives of Natural History, 22: 419-435.

External links 
 
 Chrono-Biographical Sketch: Clement Reid at www.wku.edu

1853 births
1916 deaths
Fellows of the Linnean Society of London
Fellows of the Royal Society
Fellows of the Geological Society of London
Scientists from London